The IMSA GT Championship raced on 44 different circuits in its 28-year history.

External links
Racing Sports Cars IMSA archive
World Sports Racing Prototypes IMSA archive

IMSA
IMSA GT Championship